The 1994 Dwars door België was the 49th edition of the Dwars door Vlaanderen cycle race and was held on 23 March 1994. The race started and finished in Waregem. The race was won by Carlo Bomans.

General classification

References

1994
1994 in road cycling
1994 in Belgian sport
March 1994 sports events in Europe